Jane Watson may refer to:

 Jane Watson (netball) (born 1990), New Zealand netball international
 Jane Watson Stetson, American political professional
 Jane Werner Watson (1915–2004), American children's author